Daaman, set in the Muslim backdrop, is an Indian television drama series that aired on Sahara TV now as Sahara One in 2001. The series won 'Best Location Sound' category award at the RAPA Awards in 2002.

Cast
Shyam Bhanushali
Beena Banerjee
S M Zaheer
Lubna Salim
Himani Shivpuri ... Fakhrunissa
Aamir Bashir
Vaquar Shaikh
Naved Aslam

References

External links
First Episode of Daaman on YouTube

Sahara One original programming
Indian drama television series